Olle Sandahl, born 1950, is a Swedish Christian democratic politician, member of the Riksdag 2002–2006. Sandahl is a dentist.

References

Members of the Riksdag from the Christian Democrats (Sweden)
Swedish dentists
Living people
1950 births
Members of the Riksdag 2002–2006
Date of birth missing (living people)